A synchondrosis (or primary cartilaginous joint) is a type of cartilaginous joint where hyaline cartilage completely joins together two bones. Synchondroses are different than symphyses (secondary cartilaginous joints) which are formed of fibrocartilage. Synchondroses are immovable joints and are thus referred to as synarthroses.

Examples in the human body

Permanent synchondroses 
 first sternocostal joint (where first rib meets the manubrium of the sternum)
petro-occipital synchondrosis

Temporary synchondroses (fuse during development) 
epiphyseal plates
 apophyses
 synchondroses in the developing hip bone composed of the ilium, ischium and pubis
 spheno-occipital synchondrosis

References 

Joints